Ian Rogers is a fictional character appearing in American comic books published by Marvel Comics.

Fictional character biography
While trapped in the mysterious Dimension Z, Captain America rescues Leopold Zola, the infant son of Arnim Zola. Raising the child under the name "Ian", he manages to evade Zola's forces for eleven years, until Ian is accidentally shot and apparently killed by Sharon Carter. After Captain America escapes Dimension Z, Ian is revealed to have survived and taken up a costume and shield similar to that of his adoptive father. Now calling himself Nomad, Ian acts as the defender of Dimension Z. During the AXIS storyline, Nomad assists Steve Rogers and Spider-Man in rescuing Loki in Las Vegas.

Other versions
 An alternate iteration has since been seen as the Ultimate Marvel equivalent of the Red Skull, the secret son of Captain America and Gail Richards. This character was created by Mark Millar and Carlos Pacheco, and first appeared in Ultimate Comics: Avengers #1 (October 2009). He wears simple khaki pants and a white tee shirt. After his father's presumed death during World War II, he is taken from Gail and raised on an army base where he appears to be a well-adjusted, physically superior and tactically brilliant young man, but his easygoing personality was a ruse. At seventeen, he kills over 200 men on the base and then cuts off his own face in rejection of his father, leaving a "red skull". He assassinates President John F. Kennedy as a final symbol of his rebellion against the system, and had a long career of working as a professional assassin. Eventually, the Red Skull joins A.I.M. so that he and his men can steal the Cosmic Cube's blueprints. There he finally meets Captain America and brutally beats his nemesis. Before throwing Captain America out of the helicopter, the Red Skull reveals his true identity. At A.I.M. headquarters in Alaska, the Red Skull kills the lead officer and takes charge of the operation. Now in control of the Cosmic Cube, he gains great power. As a sadistic display of his power, he has the entire A.I.M. team cannibalize each other. The Avengers arrive on the scene and immediately attack, but the Cosmic Cube imbues him with nearly unlimited power, making him absolutely invulnerable. Captain America arrives in a stolen fighter jet, but the Red Skull forces it to crash. The Captain survives the crash and teleports the jet to the Red Skull's exact coordinates, impaling him on one of the two rods that protrude from its nose. The Red Skull is taken to a hospital and kept alive long enough for his mother's goodbyes. The Red Skull explains to Nick Fury that all he wanted to do with the Cosmic Cube was to turn back time and prevent his father from being lost, so that he could grow up with a normal life. He is killed when Petra Laskov (one of his victims) shoots him in the head. Gregory Stark implies that the Red Skull was called out of retirement in order for Fury's S.H.I.E.L.D. position to be restored.
 During the 2015 Secret Wars crossover event, a version of Leopard Zola appears as Captain Hydra in a warzone where Hydra has been in power and in New York City. Captain Hydra later fights his main counterpart.

In other media
 A character named James Rogers appears in the animated film Next Avengers: Heroes of Tomorrow (2008), voiced by Noah Crawford. He is the son of Steve Rogers and Black Widow.
 A variation of Captain Hydra appears in the animated film Iron Man and Captain America: Heroes United (2014), in which Steve Rogers (voiced by Roger Craig Smith) is brainwashed.

References

Characters created by Klaus Janson
Characters created by Rick Remender
Characters created by John Romita Jr.
Comics characters introduced in 2013
Marvel Comics characters with accelerated healing
Marvel Comics characters with superhuman strength
Marvel Comics mutates
Marvel Comics superheroes
Marvel Comics titles
United States-themed superheroes
Captain America
Vigilante characters in comics